"A Kind of Christmas Card" is the debut solo single by Norwegian singer Morten Harket, released in August 1995 from his second album Wild Seed (1995). The song was written by Håvard Rem and Harket, and produced by Christopher Neil. "A Kind of Christmas Card" reached  1 in Norway, No. 9 in Iceland, and No. 53 in the United Kingdom. Harket received the Spellemannprisen "Song of the Year" award for "A Kind of Christmas Card".

A music video was filmed in Los Angeles to promote the single. It was directed by Mark Neal and features Harket's wife, Camilla. In Germany, the song was re-titled to "Burning Out Again (A Kind of Christmas Card)".

Background
The lyrics of "A Kind of Christmas Card" were written by the Norwegian poet Håvard Rem. During a visit to Los Angeles with Harket, they met a friend of Harket's, who told them the true story of a Norwegian girl who had moved to Los Angeles to become a film star, but became involved in pornography and drugs. Speaking to Robert Sandall of VH1, Harket said, "She told Håvard quite a typical story about a young Norwegian girl who came to Los Angeles to become a film star – that was her dream. And very quickly [she] started doing X-rated movies, porno films, and got deeply involved in drugs. When my friend realised what was happening to her, she contacted the Norwegian consulate and got her put on a plane back to Norway – hopefully in time. This prompted Håvard to write the lyrics."

Critical reception
British magazine Music Week gave "A Kind of Christmas Card" three out of five, adding, "A stately song with great strings on which Harket sounds about 60, so throaty and world-weary is his vocal. Not at all what you'd expect from the A-ha man, it bodes well for his first solo album despite the ill-timed winter angle."

Track listings
CD single
 "A Kind of Christmas Card" – 3:50
 "A Change Is Gonna Come" – 5:57
 "Lay Me Down Tonight" – 2:18

Cassette single (UK release)
 "A Kind of Christmas Card" – 3:50
 "Lay Me Down Tonight" – 2:18

Personnel
 Morten Harket – vocals
 Christopher Neil – producer
 Bjørn Nessjø – engineer
 Simon Hurrell – mixing
 Barry Hammond, Kai Robøle – engineers on "Lay Me Down Tonight"

Charts

References

1995 songs
1995 debut singles
Morten Harket songs
Song recordings produced by Christopher Neil
Songs written by Morten Harket
Warner Records singles